Kimberley Santos  (born August 21, 1961) is a Guamanian beauty queen who became Miss World 1980 (representing Guam) after Germany's Gabriella Brum resigned the day after her victory. The pageant was held in London, United Kingdom.  After living in Tokyo and Paris with her husband, and having two sons, they then moved to London and had their third son.  She also became a Special Constable in London.  Kimberley Santos Hill now lives in North Carolina, U.S. with her husband and their children. She works as a guardian ad litem, a court-appointed representative, for children in the care of the state's social services.

References

External links 
 Kimberley Santos at stylecraze.com

Living people
1961 births
Miss World winners
Miss World 1980 delegates
Guamanian beauty pageant winners
Metropolitan Special Constabulary officers